Saussurella is an Asian genus of ground-hoppers (Orthoptera: Caelifera) in the subfamily Batrachideinae.

Species
The Catalogue of Life and Orthoptera Species File list:
Saussurella acuticornis Zheng, 1998
Saussurella borneensis Hancock, 1912
Saussurella brachycornis Deng, 2016
Saussurella cornuta (Haan, 1842) - type species (as Acridium cornutum Haan)
Saussurella curticornus Hancock, 1912
Saussurella decurva Brunner von Wattenwyl, 1893
Saussurella indica Hancock, 1912
Saussurella inelevata Podgornaya, 1992
Saussurella javanica Bolívar, 1898
Saussurella longiptera (Yin, 1984)
Saussurella xizangensis Zheng, Lin & Shi, 2013

References

External links 
 

Tetrigidae
Caelifera genera
Orthoptera of Asia